Santiago de Calatrava is a city located in the province of Jaén, Spain. According to the 2005 census (INE), the city has a population of 862 inhabitants.

References

External links
Santiago de Calatrava - Sistema de Información Multiterritorial de Andalucía

Municipalities in the Province of Jaén (Spain)